Coreana is a butterfly genus in the family Lycaenidae. The genus is monotypic, containing the single species Coreana raphaelis, which is found in the east Palearctic in Ussuri, north-east China, Korea and Japan (Honshu).

The larva feeds on Fraxinus species (F. rhyncophylia, F. japonica, F. lanuginosa and F. mandshurica).

Subspecies
C. r. flamen (Leech, 1887) Korea
C. r. yamamotoi Okano, 1953 Japan
C. r. ohruii Shirôzu, 1962 Japan

External links
"Coreana Tutt, [1907]" at Markku Savela's Lepidoptera and Some Other Life Forms 
images representing Coreana at Consortium for the Barcode of Life

Theclini
Monotypic butterfly genera
Taxa named by J. W. Tutt
Lycaenidae genera